The Circuit: Stories from the Life of a Migrant Child is an autobiographical novel by Francisco Jiménez based in part on his journey from Mexico to the United States of America. The book, narrated by the child's point of view, follows the life of young Francisco Jiménez and his family as they move from one location to another to harvest crops in the United States. The book has three sequels, Breaking Through, Reaching Out and the fourth in the series, Taking Hold: From Migrant Childhood to Columbia University. The author translated the first three novels into Spanish under the titles Cajas de cartón (cardboard boxes), Senderos fronterizos, and Más allá de mí respectively, all edited by Houghton Mifflin.

References

External links
The Horn Book Inc. The Circuit: Author Francisco Jiménez's BGHB Fiction Award Speech
American Library Association (ALA) 1999 Best Books for Young Adults "The Circuit"
Santa Clara University: Selected Reviews of The Circuit
Santa Clara University: Awards and Recognitions for The Circuit
Santa Clara University: Selected Reviews of Breaking Through
Santa Clara University: Awards and Recognitions for Breaking Through
Santa Clara University: Study Guide for Breaking Through
Santa Clara University: Awards and Recognitions for Reaching Out
Santa Clara University: Selected Reviews of Taking Hold

1997 novels
University of New Mexico Press books
Novels set in California
Novels about immigration to the United States